The Środa Treasure is a hoard of silver and gold coins, plus gold jewellery and some precious stones. The hoard dates from the mid 14th century. Its largest component is silver coins, of which there are about 3,000 pieces. The hoard was found in years 1985–1988 during renovation works in Silesian town of Środa Śląska, Poland. Today it is mostly kept in the Regional Museum in Środa Śląska (although the owner of the hoard is the National Museum in Wrocław).

Discovery and excavation
Gold and silver coins were discovered during demolition works and digging for the foundation of the local telephone exchange building in the town of Środa on 8 June 1985. The authorities secured the original find (a vase filled with approximately 3,000 Prague groschen), however, no serious archaeological study was carried out at that time. Three years later, on 24 May 1988, during another demolition in the vicinity of the first discovery, another, even bigger find was reported (including silver and gold florin coins). Most of this new find disappeared before the site was secured by the authorities. In the following days, as enterprising individuals scoured the municipal landfill where rubble from other recently demolished buildings was deposited, reports of more discoveries started appearing; those include the first reports of jewelry.

Archaeologists began to investigate the site, and the government announced a plan to buy back items that had been looted. Later, a criminal investigation was launched, targeting those who still refused to turn back the items they had taken. Although many items were recovered, it is agreed that there are still missing items. Looted items have been recovered intermittently.

History
Over the following years, archaeologists and historians have speculated about the treasure's origins, while museums and wealthy individuals have competed for pieces of the treasure.

It is now agreed that the treasure belonged to the King (later Emperor) Charles IV of the House of Luxembourg. Around 1348, needing funds to support his claim to the title King of the Romans, Charles pawned various items to the Jewish banker Muscho (Moshe, Mojżesz) in Środa (the town of Środa was then part of the Duchy of Wroclaw (Breslau) which in 1335 had passed under reign of Bohemian kings). What is certain is that no one ever reclaimed the treasure, which was left hidden somewhere in the town for hundreds of years.

The artifacts
Various recovered items have been cataloged, and those that were damaged by the mechanical digger that uncovered them have been restored. Some items were displayed as early as 1985. Since 1995–1997 most of them have been distributed throughout museums in Lower Silesia. The majority of the items are displayed in local museum of Środa Śląska, although in the past exhibits were held in museums including the Archeologicial Museum in Wrocław, National Museum in Wrocław (which technically supervises the museum in Środa), National Archeological Museum in Warsaw, as well as abroad, in the Museum of Artistic Craft in Dresden, Germany and in Valladolid, Spain.

The treasure is considered immensely valuable, described by some as "one of most valuable archeological finds in the 20th century". In 2006 experts noted that it is difficult to put a value on it, since there are few items of similar type being auctioned anywhere in the world. One estimate from 2001 put the lowest value of the treasure at 50 million dollars; a book published in 2005 put it at 100 million dollars.

Highlights
The most valuable elements of the treasure include:
 a gold woman's crown, which probably belonged to Blanche of Valois, first wife of the emperor Charles IV
 two gold pendants, dating to the 12th century
 two gold pendants, dating to the 13th century
 a medieval gold clasp decorated with precious stones
 a ring with heads of dragons
 a ring with sapphire
 a ring with moon and star
 39 gold coins (florin)
 2924 or 3924 (sources vary) silver coins (Prague groschen)

Gallery

Notes

Further reading
 Zdzisław Skrok, Skarby Polski, Warszawa 2002, 
 Tomasz Bonek, Przeklęty skarb. Opowieść o klejnotach wartych 100 milionów dolarów, które w PRL wyrzucono na śmietnik, Wrocław 2005,

External links
The Treasure of Środa Śląska
Jewels of Europe: The Treasure of Środa Śląska

1985 in Poland
14th century in Europe
History of Silesia
Treasure troves of Medieval Europe
Treasure troves of Poland
Środa Śląska County
Individual crowns
Medieval crowns